Muhamad Buyung Ismu Lessy (born 8 May 1999) is an Indonesian professional footballer who plays as an attacking midfielder or winger for Liga 1 club Barito Putera.

Club career

Barito Putera
He was signed for Barito Putera to play in Liga 1 in the 2021 season. Lessy made his league debut on 27 September 2021 in a match against PSM Makassar at the Wibawa Mukti Stadium, Cikarang.

Career statistics

Club

Notes

References

External links
 Buyung Ismu Lessy at Soccerway
 Buyung Ismu Lessy at Liga Indonesia

1999 births
Living people
Indonesian footballers
Liga 1 (Indonesia) players
Persiter Ternate players
PS Barito Putera players
Association football midfielders
People from Ambon, Maluku
Sportspeople from Maluku (province)